The George and Mary Pine Smith House is a private house located at 3704 Sheldon Road, near Sheldon in Canton Township, Michigan. It was listed on the National Register of Historic Places in 2000.

History
The land this house sits on was first farmed by William Smith of England, who purchased  of land in 1830.  In 1835, Smith purchased another  to the east.  At some point, William built a log cabin on the property. William Smith and his wife Mary Collins Smith raised seven children on this farm, establishing a long line of Smiths farming in Canton Township.

One of William and Mary Collins Smith's children was George Smith Sr.  His son George Jr. (William's grandson) married Mary Pine.  In 1904, George Jr. and Mary Smith spent $2,058.76 to build the house that now sits on the property, replacing the log cabin.  Although the present acreage is small, outbuildings on the property give the feel of the old farmstead and the wooded edges isolate the house from the surrounding modern developments.

Description
The George and Mary Pine Smith House is a two-story gabled ell building with an additional ell at the rear. The brick house sits on a two-foot-thick fieldstone foundation laid in courses across the facade.  Many of the bricks in the walls were handmade at the building site.  Two doors in the front facade are covered by a small porch with decorative millwork.  The front facade includes a bay window, and two of the other front windows have a transom sash, one with stained glass in the transom area and the other with beveled glass.  Three more large transomed windows are in other elevations, and the remainder of the house's windows are narrow one over ones.  The windows are topped with a segmental arch formed of corbelled bricks.

See also
Canton Township MPS
Canton Charter Township, Michigan

References

Further reading
 - front cover picture is of the Smith Farmhouse

Houses on the National Register of Historic Places in Michigan
Houses completed in 1904
Houses in Wayne County, Michigan
National Register of Historic Places in Wayne County, Michigan